Borassus madagascariensis is a species in the palm family Arecales endemic to Madagascar.

The palm is native to western Madagascar, where it is found along lowland watercourses in the dry forests below 100 meters elevation. It has a fragmented distribution and is known from only five locations.

The palm heart and newly germinated seedlings are edible, and an alcoholic drink is produced from the fruit.

References

External links
PROTAbase on Borassus madagascariensis

madagascariensis
Vulnerable plants
Plants described in 1913
Plants described in 1907
Endemic flora of Madagascar
Flora of the Madagascar dry deciduous forests
Edible plants
Taxa named by Henri Lucien Jumelle
Taxa named by Joseph Marie Henry Alfred Perrier de la Bâthie
Taxa named by Wenceslas Bojer